North Shore High School is located in Glen Head, New York. It opened in September 1957 and graduated its first class in June 1958. The first principal was Dr. John French.

The school is a part of the North Shore School District. As of 2021, approximately 878 students attend North Shore High School. The current principal is Eric Contreras. In 2021, Newsweek ranked North Shore as the 336th best public school in the country. North Shore's athletic teams are known as the Vikings, and have a long-time rivalry with neighboring Glen Cove High School.

As of the 2020-2021 school year, the school had an enrollment of 878 students and 82 classroom teachers (on an FTE basis), for a student–teacher ratio of 12.2:1. There were 79 students (9% of enrollment) eligible for free lunch and 17 (2% of students) eligible for reduced-cost lunch.

In 2021, North Shore High School was recognized as a 2021 National Blue Ribbon School in the Exemplary High Performing category. 

For many years North Shore has had an "open campus" policy, where students were allowed to leave campus during lunch and other free periods so they could work on independent projects. Some community members wanted North Shore to become a "closed campus," where leaving campus was not permitted during free periods. They were concerned due to automobile and pedestrian safety and possibilities of students conducting recreational drug usage off campus.

Notable alumni
 Aron Ain (born 1957, class of 1975), CEO, UKG (Ultimate Kronos Group) 
 Mac Ayres, (born 1996, class of 2014) R&B musician
 Mike Armstrong (born 1954, class of 1972), a professional baseball player
 Rose Bird (1936-1999), former Chief Judge of the California Supreme Court
 Hank Bjorklund (1968), former NFL running back with the New York Jets (1972-1974)
 Ed Blankmeyer (born 1954, class of 1972), a professional baseball coach and former second baseman
 Dylan Brady (born 1998), Country Music Singer 
 David Chesnoff (born 1955, class of 1973), Criminal Defense Attorney
 Edmund Coffin (born 1955, class of 1973), Olympic Gold Medalist, Equestrian, Summer Olympics 1976
 Jacob Faber, drummer/percussionist (Sunflower Bean) 
 Jared Ian Goldman, (class of 1997), film and television producer. 
 Robin L. Higgins (née Ross), former Under Secretary for the U.S. Department of Veterans Affairs
 Michael McKean (1965), American television and film actor. Noted for playing the character David St. Hubbins in “This is Spinal Tap” 
 Eden Ross Lipson (1943-2009, class of 1960), New York Times editor
 Kate McKinnon (born 1984, class of 2002), comedian, Saturday Night Live.
 Richard Mirabito (born 1956, class of 1974), Pennsylvania Politician,
 Gregory Raposo (born 1985, class of 2003), Dream Street band member
 Jim Romano (born 1959, class of 1977), a professional football player
 Jake Siewert (born 1964), White House Press Secretary
 Amanda Sobhy (born 1993), professional squash player.
 Sabrina Sobhy (born 1996), professional squash player.
 Darin Strauss (born 1970, class of 1988), novelist.

References

External links

 North Shore School District - Official website
 North Shore High School Profile 2020-2021

Public high schools in New York (state)
Schools in Nassau County, New York
1957 establishments in New York (state)